Nilüfer - Grup Nazar was a Turkish band that entered the Eurovision Song Contest 1978. The band included Olcayto Ahmet Tuğsuz who went on to compose Turkey's Eurovision entries in 1982 and 1987 and San Marino's entries in 2016 and 2019. Their song "Sevince", written by Dağhan Baydur and Hulki Aktunç came a clear first at the Turkish TV contest, finished at 18th of 20 with only 2 points. The B-side was "Darling", also written by Baydur. Dağhan Baydur would later (1999) produce the Turkish-language Beatles cover album Beatles Alaturca with Fuat Güner of MFÖ and Erdal Kızılçay.

The group were consisted of Olcayto Ahmet Tuğsuz, Zeynep Tuğsuz and Dağhan Baydur along with Nilüfer Yumlu.

References

Eurovision Song Contest entrants for Turkey
Turkish musical groups